Charles W. Householder (February 8, 1854 – September 3, 1913) was an American Major League Baseball played mainly as a first baseman and catcher for the Baltimore Orioles in  and the Brooklyn Atlantics in .

Career
On July 18, 1882, pitcher Tony Mullane of the Louisville Eclipse, normally a right-handed pitcher, began to pitch left-handed whenever a Baltimore Oriole left-handed hitter would come to bat.  This strategy appeared to work until the ninth inning when left-handed hitting Charlie Householder hit a home run to win the game for the Orioles.

For the  season, Householder signed with and was playing for the Merrits of Camden, New Jersey, when Charlie Byrne of fellow league team, the Brooklyn Grays bought his contract, along with other Merrits Sam Kimber, Bill Greenwood, Frank Fennelly, and Jack Corcoran.  He finished out the year and transitioned with the team over to the American Association, where they would be known as the Atlantics.

On October 4, 1884, Householder collected two of the Atlantics four hits off Tony Mullane, this time of the Toledo Blue Stockings, a single and a double. The game went 10 innings and was called because of darkness, ending in a 0-0 tie, with Atlantic pitcher Sam Kimber recording the first extra-inning no-hitter.

Householder died in his hometown of Philadelphia at the age of 59, and is interred at Mount Vernon Cemetery in Philadelphia.

References

External links

1854 births
1913 deaths
19th-century baseball players
Baseball players from Philadelphia
Burials at Mount Vernon Cemetery (Philadelphia)
Major League Baseball catchers
Major League Baseball first basemen
Baltimore Orioles (AA) players
Brooklyn Atlantics (AA) players
Springfield (minor league baseball) players
Utica Pent Ups players
Ashland (minor league baseball) players
Charleston (minor league baseball) players
Atlanta (minor league baseball) players